The eighth season of the reality television series Black Ink Crew aired on VH1 from August 14, 2019, until April 29, 2020. It chronicles the daily operations and staff drama at an African American-owned and operated tattoo shop in Harlem, New York.

Cast

Main
 Ceaser Emanuel
 Puma Robinson
 Sky Days
 Donna Lombardi
 Ted Ruks
 Walt Miller 
 Young Bae
 Miss Kitty

Recurring
Quani Robinson
Alex "The Vagina Slayer"
Tatiana
Krystal
Q
Mike
London

Guest
Mama Bae
Emani
O'S**t Duncan
Nikki Duncan
Jemz 
Naeem Shareef
Phor Brumfield

Episodes

References

2019 American television seasons
2020 American television seasons
Black Ink Crew